Mehmet Genç (4 May 1934 – 18 March 2021) was a Turkish economic historian. He specialized in studying the economics of the Ottoman Empire. He earned his degree in political sciences, finance, and economics from Ankara University in 1958.

Distinctions
Doctor honoris causa from Istanbul University (1966)
Grand Prize of Culture and Arts from the President of Turkey (2015)

References

1934 births
2021 deaths
20th-century Turkish historians
People from Arhavi
Ankara University alumni
21st-century Turkish historians